Sargin, Šargin, Sargın or Shargin (Cyrillic: Шаргин) may refer to
Sargın, Gercüş, a village in Turkey
Nada Šargin (born 1977), Serbian actress
Yuri Shargin (born 1960), Russian cosmonaut 
Sargin Aristeu Mussi